The Teme River is a river of the Marlborough Region of New Zealand's South Island. It flows north from its sources in rough hill country north of the Awatere River valley to reach the Avon River.

See also
List of rivers of New Zealand

References

Rivers of the Marlborough Region
Rivers of New Zealand